Messua may be:
 Messua (Jungle books), a fictional character in Rudyard Kipling's The Jungle Book and The Second Jungle Book
 Messua (spider), a genus of spiders